Pope Mark IV of Alexandria, 84th Pope of Alexandria and Patriarch of the See of St. Mark.

The episcopate of Pope Mark IV (البابا مرقس الرابع) lasted for 14 years, 4 months and 26 days from 5 September 1348 AD (8 Thout 1064 AM) to 31 January 1363 AD (8 Amsheer 1079 AM). He departed this world on 31 January 1363 AD after a great struggle, perseverance, and patience. Upon his death, he was buried in the monastery of Shahran (دير شهران). The See of St Mark remained vacant for 3 months and 6 days after his death.

In his time, the Papal Residence was at the Church of The Holy Virgin Mary & St Mercurius in Haret Zuweila (حارة زويلة) in Coptic Cairo.

Mamluk Sultans during his episcopate 

His time in the Patriarchate coincided with a series of Mamluke Sultans: 	

Sultan Nasser Hassan Ben Mohamed - -(first time) (1347–1351 AD) -  السلطان حسن

Sultan Salah Eddin Saleh Ben Mohamed - (1351–1354 AD) - الصالح حسن بن ناصر الناصر

Sultan Nasser Hassan Ben Mohamed (second time) (1354–1361) -  السلطان حسن

Sultan Salah Eddin Mohamed Ben Hagi (1361–1363) -  محمد المنصور

Sultan Ashraf Zeen Eddin Ben Hassan (1363–1376)

Biography 

After the repose of his predecessor Pope Peter V (the 83rd Patriarch of Alexandria) on 6 July 1348 AD, the Episcopal Seat remained vacant for two months (60 days). Finally, a monk (and also a priest) by the name of Gabriel (أبونا الراهب القس غبريال) from the Monastery of Shahran (دير شهران) was chosen as patriarch under the name Pope Mark IV of Alexandria. It was the monastery where his predecessor, Pope Peter V, used to be its priest before his elevation to the episcopal seat in 1340 AD. At the time of his elevation to the episcopal seat, Priest Gabriel was assigned to serve at the Church of the Holy Virgin Mary and St Damiana, known as the Hanging Church in Coptic Cairo (كنيسة العذراء المعروفة بالمعلقة). Priest Gabriel was also one of those who attended the consecration of the Holy Oil of Chrismation (Miron) in 1342 AD at the time of his predecessor, Pope Peter V (Episcopate 1340 - 1348 AD).

His name at birth was Farag-Allah (فرج الله). He was from the city of Qaliub, in the Nile delta, just to the north of Cairo. He was a monk at the monastery of Shahran (دير شهران) who then became a priest at the same monastery and then was assigned to serve at the Church of the Holy Virgin Mary and St Damiana, known as the Hanging Church in Coptic Cairo (كنيسة العذراء المعروفة بالمعلقة). Finally, he became the 84th Patriarch on 5 September 1348 AD.

The entire period from the seventh century to the nineteenth century was a period of continual persecution of the Egyptian Church at the hands of various Muslim rulers. This would be punctured with short periods of peace in which the persecution would temporarily drop in intensity.

A persecution arose in the later days of Al-Sultan Hassan Al-Nasser [Sultan Nasser Hassan Ben Mohamed (first time, 1347-1351 AD) -  السلطان حسن]. The Spaniards had requested the reopening of the Melkite churches (which were closed at the time) and requested the release of a Spanish prisoner. After the Sultan had agreed to the requests, he came back and demanded a large ransom for the prisoner, and Spain rejected the request. A dispute arose. Somehow, the Copts bore the afflictions of this dispute, and a persecution ensued. This persecution was cut short by the death of Al-Sultan Hassan Al-Nasser in 1351 AD. He was succeeded by his son the second good and did not carry the attributes of his name anything. It was strange that, amid this, the persecution was clear. They arrested a Coptic man who came from the countryside to Cairo. He called on his brothers to keep faith, and rebuked the men and tortured him for a week. Then they cut off his head and burned his body on the road. The non-Copts have suffered from plague and Copts have suffered persecution and plague.

When Al-Sultan Al-Saleh II [Sultan Salah Eddin Saleh Ben Mohamed - (1351-1354 AD) - الصالح حسن بن ناصر الناصر] took over the throne in 1351 AD (1068 AM, 752 AH), matters took a turn for the worse.

Matters were further complicated when the Plague struck Egypt in impunity in 1353 AD (1069 AM, 754 AH). The plague ruined most of the Egyptian villages.

In 1354 AD (1071 AM, towards the beginning of the year 755 AH),  the Muslims raised detailed reports of the Christian property that belonged to the Coptic monasteries. These reports were transmitted to the Diwan of Ahbash (ديوان الأحباش). Prince Shikho, Prince Sarghatmesh, and Prince Taz were presented with these reports. They were in charge of the government in 1054 AD. They decided that these properties belonging to the Coptic monasteries should be handed over to various princes to supplement their grants.  The property of the Church and the monasteries that were confiscated were 25,000 feddans (Hectares).

After a great struggle, perseverance, and patience, Pope Mark IV departed on 31 January 1363 AD.

14th-century Coptic Orthodox popes of Alexandria
1363 deaths